Seabriella fasciata is a species of beetle in the family Cerambycidae, the only species in the genus Seabriella.

References

Trachyderini
Monotypic beetle genera